Francine Caron (born 18 September 1945 in Batz-sur-Mer) is a French writer and poet.

Life
Caron studied at the Lycée Joachim du Bellay, Angers, Liceo Frances (French High School), Madrid, and Faculty of Letters at the University of Poitiers – Diplome d’études superieures, 1966, Agrégation in Spanish language and literature, 1967

Academic career
 Teacher at the Lycée du Bellay, Angers, 1967–68
 At the University of Haute-Bretagne-Rennes II: Assistante, 1969; Maitre-Assistante, 1974; Maitre de conferences, 1985
 Lecturer in French poetry at the Centre de Recherches en literature et linguistique de l’Anjou (CRLLAB) beginning in 1978; research associate, 1991
 Since 1999, F.C. has supervised the collection of her works in the archives of contemporary poetry at the University of Angers.

Poetic career
 She began writing since 1965
 Known as published poet since 1975 (articles in "Le Journal des Poètes" -Brussels- and in "Insula" -Madrid-)
 Founder and editor of the quarterly poetry review Nard that published 375 poets between 1974 and 1981 and more poets between 2003 and 2005
 Founding member of the journal Phreatique, 1977; of the Angevin Society of Poets, 1982; and of Transparleurs, 2004
 Contributor to more than 100 poetry journals since 1974
 She has published poems in many Anthologies. Some are best known in Paris : Ellipses, Hermann, La Table Ronde, Nil or Seghers editions, etc.
 Member of prize juries for :
 La Rose d'or of Doué-la-Fontaine, 1975–95
 Centre Froissart de Valenciennes
 The Grand Prix de la Ville d'Angers, 1982–2000
 The Ville de la Baule, since 2000

English influences
 William Shakespeare influenced her from the age of ten. At that time, French radio, in cooperation with the B.B.C., broadcast the plays. F.C. was thrilled and later at the Lycée du Bellay read "Romeo et Juliette", etc. She has seen performances of most of his plays, at the Festival of Avignon, the Comédie de Caen and Rennes, on television and films.
 William Wordsworth and Percy Shelley; the Irish poet W. B. Yeats.
 Emily Brontë ("Wuthering Heights"), G. K. Chesterton for his satirical wit, D. H. Lawrence for his eroticism.
 Oscar Wilde, Virginia Woolf and ... Agatha Christie*
– For American influences -> this section is being prepared

Publications
Her publications, some under the pseudonym Francile Caron, include more than sixty books, including collector's editions translated into seven European languages (English by the American poet Basia Miller) and Arabic and Hebrew:
 Orphée sauvage, 1973
 En vers et pour tous and Amour ephemeride, Chambelland, Paris, 1974
 Les Corps sourciers, Millas-Martin, Paris, 1975
 Le Paradis terrestre, Froissart, 1976, Centre Froissart prize, 1976
 Femme majeure, Millas-Martin, Paris, François Villon prize, 1977
 Espagne veuve and Cathedres, 1977
 L'Année d'amour, 1979
 Quinze Ans de poésie and Picardie-Poesie, 1981
 D’Islande, 1982
 Musée du Louvre, 1984
 Bretagne au cœur, Osiris, Paris 1985; liminar poem by Eugene Guillevic
 Terres celtes, 1986
 L'Amour le feu, Eklitra, 1991
 Lecture-poem 1992 : D'Europe, Presses de l'universite d'Angers, 1993
 Maldives, 1997
 Étreinte-Éternité 1998, 2d ed. 2000
 Sur sept tableaux de Caillaud d'Angers, Voyage autour du monde en poésie and Norway, chemins du Nord, 1999
 Ars Amandi, MéluZine, Égyptiennes, Femme à l'oiseau and Petit guide du square des Batignolles, 2000
 Tanka du cloître angevin, 2001
 Macrocosme du corps humain sous le regard d'1 microscope électronique, 2002
 Planète foot/ War Planet, 2004
 Erotica tumescens and Mortes saisons, haïku(s), 2005
 Ciel-Symphonie and Parcs et Lunaparks de Paris, with a postface by Jean-Pierre Desthuilliers, 2006
 Nuit Cap Nord, Venise avec le temps, Jardin de simples and Shoah, 2007
 Sphinx / Sphinge and Arbres (z) Amants, 2008
 Atlantiques, Cantate pour le Grand Canyon and Goya, Goya!, 2009
 Haïkus des doudous, Orphee naguere, Grand Louvre, Bleu Ciel d'Europe, Entre deux Rembrandt(s), and Antre de Rembrandt, 2010
 Taj Mahal and Géométrie(s) du Chat, haïku, 2011
 Riches heures du sexe amoureux, 2012
 Stances à Felix and Âmes animales, 2013

Special issues of journal
 L'Oreillette, no. 35 : F. Caron I, Parler la vie (1965–1985), 2001
 L'Oreillette, no. 37 : F. Caron II (1985–1997), 2002
 Nard, no. 29 : F. Caron III, Chroniques de renaissance (1997–2003), 2003
 Poésie/premiere no. 48 : F.C. de l'Amour a l'Humour, 2010, a study by Guy Chaty

Translations
Translations of contemporary Spanish drama, including La Camisa by Lauro Olmo performed at "la Comédie de Saint-Etienne-Jean Dasté"

Honours
 Prix de la Rose d'or de Doué-la-Fontaine, 1974
 Prix du Centre Froissart de Valenciennes, 1975
 Prix François Villon, 1997
 Grand Prix of the Ville de La Baule, 1997

Memberships
 P.E.N. Club
 Sociétaire of the Societé des gens de lettres and of Ecrivains Bretons
 Member of : Arts et Jalons, Cercle Alienor J. Krafft, Poésie-sur-Seine, Donner à voir, Femmes poésie et liberté, Transignum and Rencontres européennes

References

1945 births
Living people
Academic staff of Rennes 2 University
People from Loire-Atlantique